The Czech Symphony Orchestra (Czech: Český symfonický orchestr, short: ČSO) is a classical orchestra based in Prague.

As an ensemble put together for various international recording and concert projects, it has been active since 1994. The orchestra was composed of musicians with recording as well as concert experience and has worked with conductors like Erwin Gutawa. Currently under the leadership of Oskar Rózsa the orchestra's latest projects involved film music recordings for internationally successful Czech movies like Lidice.

External links 
Homepage of the Czech Symphony Orchestra

References 

Musical groups established in 1994
Czech orchestras
Arts organizations established in 1994
1994 establishments in the Czech Republic